Pavel Kuptsov (born 6 January 1998) is a Belarusian footballer playing currently for Gorki.

References

External links
 
 
 Profile at Pressball.by

1998 births
Living people
People from Mogilev
Sportspeople from Mogilev Region
Belarusian footballers
Association football forwards
FC Dnepr Mogilev players
FC Torpedo Mogilev players
FC Gorki players